1,4-Cyclohexanedicarboxylic acid describes a pair of organic compounds with the formula .  The CO2H groups are attached to the opposite carbon centers of the cyclohexane ring.  These groups can be cis or trans. Other isomers of cyclohexanedicarboxylic acid are known, but the 1,4- isomers are of greatest interest, perhaps because they are obtainable from a commodity chemical.  Specifically, hydrogenation of terephthalic acid affords the title compound:
.
The trans isomer has been more heavily studied.  It has been examined as a precursor to polycarbonates and as a building block for metal-organic frameworks.

References

Dicarboxylic acids
Cyclohexanes